Matthew Town is the chief and only settlement on Great Inagua Island of the Bahamas. It is located on the southwest corner of the island. It was named after Bahamian Governor George Matthew (1844–1849) and first settled during his tenure in office. It has several buildings dating to the 19th century including the 1870 Great Inagua Lighthouse.

Almost the entire population of Inagua resides in Matthew Town (approx. 1,000 people), and many of them are employed by the Morton Salt Company, the island's largest employer.

Climate
Matthew Town has a hot semi-arid climate (Köppen BSh), being much drier than the northern Bahamas as it lies further from the wet western side of the North Atlantic subtropical anticyclone. The wettest months are May and September to November.

See also
 List of lighthouses in the Bahamas

Notes

References

External links
 Picture of Great Inagua Lighthouse at UFL.edu

Populated places in the Bahamas
Inagua
Lighthouses in the Bahamas